Dimitrovgrad (Cyrillic: Димитровград) is the name of three towns in Europe, all named after Georgi Dimitrov:
 Dimitrovgrad, Bulgaria
 Dimitrovgrad, Russia
 Dimitrovgrad, Serbia (also known as Caribrod)